The Yinchuan Ring Expressway, designated as G2004 is an expressway in Ningxia, Northern China orbiting the city of Yinchuan.  This expressway is a branch of G6 Beijing–Lhasa Expressway.

Detailed itinerary

References

Expressways in Ningxia
Chinese national-level expressways
Yinchuan